Billy Reil (born June 19, 1979) is an American former professional wrestler currently working the Northeastern Independent circuit in the United States. A longtime veteran of the Tri-State area, he was a mainstay of Jersey All Pro Wrestling during the late 1990s.

He is also a guest writer for wrestling websites such as Wrestling-News.com, most notably his "Reil World" and "Billy Reil Uncut" columns.  Reil is also a classically trained actor, having starred in films such as "Purgatory" and "The Pit".

Career

Early life and career
Born in South Philadelphia, Pennsylvania, Reil was a wrestling fan growing up and often attended World Wrestling Federation events at The Spectrum during the late 1980s. As a teenager, he began hanging out at the ECW Arena attempting to make contacts in the professional wrestling business and eventually met Angel Orsini, who then introduced Reil to Reckless Youth. He soon made his in-ring debut on May 19, 1995 in a match against his childhood friend Trent Acid. During the summer of 1996, Reil began training with The Pit Bulls before leaving for college the following year.

In 1997, he was given a 4-day scholarship to Penn State University for his athletic skills on the baseball diamond. While at Penn State, Reil continued to wrestle outside the university. Unfortunately, his baseball career was cut short when he was released for pitching an ERA of 16.3.

Jersey All Pro Wrestling and the independents
Reil continued to wrestle and was honing his craft working in Jersey All Pro Wrestling, the National Wrestling Alliance (NWA) New Jersey territory, and Grande Wrestling Alliance.

He would team with Trent Acid to defeat Homicide and Kane D for the JAPW Tag Team titles in Bayonne, New Jersey on January 29. The two would defend the titles for a month before losing the titles to Dave Desire and Rick Silver on February 26, 1999.

Reil attended Dory Funk, Jr.'s Dojo in 1999. By 2000, Reil had gained a considerable following in the Northeastern United States and had notable matches including a 3-way dance against Sabu and Low Ki on April 7, 2000.

Later that year, while wrestling at an event for the Central Wrestling Coalition, Reil suffered a separated shoulder and  neck injuries in a match against Breaker Morant in South Philadelphia in November.

Recent years
During the next two years he would continue competing in independent promotions including Frank Goodman's UXW teaming with Mike Tobin as "Knight Life" to defeat the Christopher Street Connection for the vacant UXW Tag Team titles on April 15, 2005 and was scheduled to defend their titles against Papadon and Havok, the Solution at the Chris Candido Memorial Show in Long Island, New York on May 21 however Reil failed to show up for the event. During the show, Reil's partners Mike Tobin and Trent Acid criticized Reil during an interview in which they mentioned his staged retirement via the Internet earlier that year and introduced Trinity and Justin Credible to the "Knight Life" stable.

The following year at an event for National Wrestling Superstars, Reil defeating Corey Havoc, Dan Petit and J.R. in a Four-Way Jobbers Match on December 29, 2006.

Throughout this period of his legendary wrestling career, Reil began acting and appeared in films such as "Purgatory", "In the O-Zone", "Cord Jumpers 2", and "Shakespeare & Steve".  
  
In January 2007, he began feuding with Danny Demanto and, while their first encounter on January 26 resulted in a no contest, Reil defeated Demanto and Bison Bravado in a tag team match with Jim Neidhart the following day. The following month, in a match for the vacant UXW X-Treme Championship, he would participate in a 7-way match with Chasyn Rance, Kirby Mack, T.J. Mack, Naphtali, Greatness, Jerrelle Clark later losing to Kirby Mack in Orlando, Florida on February 24.

As of February 2016, Reil announced he is planning a comeback to the ring via his official Twitter account (@BillyReilWWE ), citing he can still keep up with today's talent pool.

Championships and accomplishments
Grande Wrestling Alliance
GWA Cruiserweight Championship (2 times)
Independent Superstars of Professional Wrestling
ISPW Light Heavyweight Championship (2 times)
Jersey All Pro Wrestling
JAPW Light Heavyweight Championship (3 times)
JAPW Tag Team Championship (1 time) - with Trent Acid
Pro Wrestling Illustrated
PWI ranked him #430 of the 500 best singles wrestlers of the PWI 500 in 2000
Trademark Wrestling
TMF Cruiserweight Championship (1 time)
USA Pro Wrestling
USA Pro United States Championship (1 time)
USA Pro Tag Team Championship (1 time) with Mike Tobin

References

External links
The Minority Report: The Masked Maniac Show w/ Billy Reil
Seven Deadly Questions by Gerry Strauss
Acid Pro Wrestling: Billy Reil
Profile at Online World of Wrestling
Other Superstars: Billy Reid

1979 births
American male professional wrestlers
Living people